Eric Carlson may refer to:

 Eric Carlson (Bonus Army) (1894–1932), U.S. veteran shot in the Bonus Army protests
 Eric Carlson (architect) (born 1963), American architect
 Eric Carlson (musician) (born 1958), founding member and lead guitarist of The Mentors